The 2005 Powergen Rugby League Challenge Cup was played by teams from across Europe during the 2005 rugby league season. Hull F.C. won the cup defeating Leeds Rhinos in the final.

Qualifying round

First round

Second round

Third round

Fourth round
 2 April Leeds Rhinos 26 - Warrington Wolves 22
 2 April Pia Donkeys 53 - Keighley Cougars 26
 2 April Toulouse Olympique 60 - Wath Brow Hornets 12
 3 April Barrow Raiders 33 - Sheffield Eagles 26
 3 April Batley Bulldogs 8 - Leigh Centurions 25
 3 April Doncaster Dragons 34 - Workington 18
 3 April Bradford Bulls 80 - Featherstone Rovers 14
 3 April Halifax R.L.F.C. 23 - Castleford Tigers 14
 3 April St Helens 26 - Huddersfield Giants 22
 3 April London Broncos 70 - Hunslet Hawks 4
 3 April York City Knights 32 - Oldham 28
 3 April Salford City Reds 30 - Rochdale Hornets 24
 3 April Union Treiziste Catalane 32 - Hull Kingston Rovers 18
 3 April Hull F. C. 36 - Wakefield Trinity Wildcats 12
 3 April Widnes Vikings 32 - Swinton Lions 18
 3 April Wigan Warriors 42 - Whitehaven Warriors 4

Fifth round
 6 May Leeds Rhinos 70 - Pia Donkeys 0
 6 May St Helens 62 - York City Knights 0
 6 May Wigan Warriors 16 - Union Treiziste Catalane 10
 7 May Hull F.C. 26 - Bradford Bulls 24
 7 May Toulouse Olympique 32 - Doncaster Dragons 18
 8 May Widnes Vikings 50 - Barrow Raiders 8
 8 May Leigh Centurions 40 - Halifax R.L.F.C. 20
 8 May Salford City Reds 12 - London Broncos 26

Quarter-finals
 24 June Leeds Rhinos 32 - London Broncos 12
 26 June St Helens 75 - Wigan Warriors 0
 26 June Toulouse Olympique 40 - Widnes Vikings 24
 25 June Hull F.C. 46 - Leigh Centurions 14.

Semi-finals
 30 July Hull F.C. 34 - St Helens 8
 31 July Leeds Rhinos 56 - Toulouse Olympique 18

Final
Katherine Jenkins performed at the match which was on 27 August at Millennium Stadium, Cardiff and attended by 74,213 spectators. Leeds came to the final 4/1 favourites to win and stamped their authority on the game in the early stages with a penalty try which was converted by Kevin Sinfield. Hull fought back with a try from Motu Tony converted by Danny Brough. Hull took the lead for the first time through Gareth Raynor's try in the corner after a superb pass by Nathan Blacklock. Brough converted brilliantly to make the score 12–6. Leeds fought back and a try from Danny Ward was converted by Sinfield to draw the scores level. A dreadful Marcus Bai error in his own in-goal area as he tried to keep the ball alive gifted Richard Whiting a try for Hull which was converted by Brough. Minutes later Brough added a drop goal to make the score 19–12 to Hull. A Mark Calderwood converted try set up a tense finish with the score at 19–18.

It seemed as though Leeds were going to walk away with the spoils as Marcus Bai rectified his earlier error by grabbing a late try which was converted by Sinfield and left the score 24–19. To immense noise from the Hull fans, Hull-born Paul Cooke broke through the Leeds defence and grounded the ball down underneath the posts to allow for a simple conversion. The youngster Danny Brough capped off an outstanding performance by converting the try under pressure to make the score 25–24 to Hull. In the dying seconds Richard Swain charged down a drop goal attempt to keep the scores as they were and Hull held on for arguably the best Challenge Cup final ever. Hull overturned all the odds, beating Bradford and cup holders St Helens along the way.

Scores
 4–0 penalty try (Calderwood)
 6–0 Sinfield con
 6–4 Tony try
 6–6 Brough con
 6–10 Raynor try
 6–12 Brough con
 10–12 Ward try
 12–12 Sinfield con
 12–16 Whiting try
 12–18 Brough con
 12–19 Brough drop goal
 16–19 Calderwood try
 18–19 Sinfield con
 22–19 Bai try
 24–19 Sinfield con
 24–23 Cooke try
 24–25 Brough con

Rosters

Leeds

Coach: Tony Smith

 1. Richie Mathers
 2. Mark Calderwood
 3. Chev Walker
 4. Keith Senior
 5. Marcus Bai
 13. Kevin Sinfield (c)
 7. Rob Burrow
 8. Ryan Bailey
 9. Matt Diskin
 15. Danny Ward
 11. Ali Lauiti'iti
 12. Chris McKenna
 20. Gareth Ellis

Subs
 6. Danny McGuire
 14. Andrew Dunemann
 16. Willie Poching
 18. Jamie Jones-Buchanan

Hull

Coach: John Kear

 14. Motu Tony
 2. Nathan Blacklock
 3. Kirk Yeaman
 30. Richard Whiting
 5. Gareth Raynor
 6. Richard Horne
 21. Danny Brough
 8. Ewan Dowes
 9. Richard Swain (c)
 20. Garreth Carvell
 11. Shayne McMenemy
 12. Stephen Kearney
 13. Paul Cooke

Subs
 10. Paul King
 15. Jamie Thackray
 16. Tommy Saxton
 17. Chris Chester

Referee
 S Ganson (St Helens)

Man of the Match

Kevin Sinfield was the man of match winning the Lance Todd Trophy, but was the losing captain.

References

External links
Hull stun Leeds in Challenge Cup, article on news.bbc.co.uk
2005 Challenge Cup Final at rlphotos.com

Challenge Cup
Challenge Cup
Challenge Cup
2005 in French rugby league
Hull F.C.